The Court of Justice of São Paulo is the judicial branch of the Government of São Paulo, with head office in the capital and jurisdiction in all state territory.

It is constituted of 56 Judiciary Districts through all state and has 360 desembargadores, considered the largest court in the world. If considered, besides desembargadores, also substitute judges of second degree and summoned judges, the amount of judges reaches 729. In January 2009, the quantity of cases in progress reached 18.21 million.

The president elect for the 2022/2023 biennium is desembargador Ricardo Mair Anafe.

Assignments
The Court of Justice of São Paulo, as superior instance of the Judiciary of the state, is the appealing instance to the sentences given by a judge of first instance in the state districts. Its assignments are defined by the Constitution of the State of São Paulo, in its Article 74, being some of them:

 Prosecute and judge originally:
 in common criminal offenses: the Vice-Governor, the State Secretaries, the State Deputies, the Prosecutor-General of Justice, the Prosecutor-General of the State, the Public Advocate General and the Mayors.
 in common criminal offenses and responsibility crimes: the judges of the Military Justice Court, the Judges of Law and Judges of Military Law (first instance), the members of the Public Prosecutor's Office (except the Prosecutor-General of Justice), the General Police Chief of the Civil Police and the Commander of the Military Police of the State of São Paulo.
 the writs of security and the habeas data against the Governor acts, of the Board and Presidency of the Legislative Assembly, the own Court or any of its members, the Presidents of the State and City Court of Accounts, the Prosecutor-General of Justice, the Mayor and the President of the Municipal Chamber of São Paulo.
 the habeas corpus in the cases which appeals are from within its competence or when the coercion or patient is an authority directly subject to its jurisdiction, except for the jurisdiction of the Military Justice Court, in cases which appeals are from its jurisdiction.
 the writs of injunction, when the inexistence of a state of municipal regulatory rule, from any of the Powers, include from indirect administration, becomes impossible the exercise of rights secured in this Constitution.
 the representation of insconstitutionality of the law or state or municipal normative act, contested before the State Constitution, the request of intervention in the cities and acts of unconstitutionality by omissão, in view of the precept in the State Constitution.
 the rescission acts of its judged and criminal appeals of cases in its jurisdiction.
 the attribution conflicts between the administrative and judiciary authorities of the state.
 the complaint for the guarantee of authority of its decision.
 the representation of unconstitutionality of law or municipal normative act, contested before the Federal Constitution.
 Invoke the intervention of the Union in the state to guarantee the freen exercise of the Judiciary, in the terms of the State and Federal Constitutions.
 Request the intervention of the state in a city, in terms provided by law.

Current composition of directors
 Ricardo Mair Anafe - President
 Guilherme Gonçalves Strenger - Vice-President
 Fernando Antonio Torres Garcia - Inspector-General
 Artur César Beretta da Silveira - President of the Private Law Section
 Wanderley José Federighi - President of Public Law Section
 Francisco José Galvão Bruno - President of Criminal Law Section
 José Carlos Gonçalves Xavier de Aquino - Dean

See also
 Court of Justice
 Superior Court of Justice
 Supreme Federal Court

References

Judiciary of Brazil
Subnational supreme courts
1874 establishments in Brazil
Courts and tribunals established in 1874
Government of São Paulo (state)